Leigh Thompson may refer to: 

Leigh-Anne Thompson, a retired American professional tennis player
Leigh Thompson (academic),  J. Jay Gerber Professor of Dispute Resolution & Organizations in the Kellogg School of Management at Northwestern University